The American Champion Two-Year-Old Filly is an American Thoroughbred horse racing honor awarded annually to a female horse in Thoroughbred flat racing. It became part of the Eclipse Awards program in 1971.

The award originated in 1936 when both the Daily Racing Form (DRF) and Turf and Sports Digest (TSD) magazine began naming an annual champion. Starting in 1950, the Thoroughbred Racing Associations (TRA) began naming its own champion. The following list provides the name of the horses chosen by both of these organizations. There were several disagreements, with more than one champion being recognized on seven occasions.

The Daily Racing Form, the Thoroughbred Racing Associations, and the National Turf Writers Association all joined forces in 1971 to create the Eclipse Award. In 1978, the voting resulted in a tie between two fillies.

Champions from 1887 through 1935 were selected retrospectively by a panel of experts as published by The Blood-Horse magazine.

Honorees

Eclipse Awards

Daily Racing Form, Turf & Sport Digest and Thoroughbred Racing Association Awards

Daily Racing Form and Turf & Sport Digest Awards

The Blood-Horse retrospective champions

 † Hamburg Belle was always the property of James B. A. Haggin but as a convenience raced under the name of her manager, Sydney Paget.

Notes

References
 The Eclipse Awards at the Thoroughbred Racing Associations of America, Inc.
 The Bloodhorse.com Champion's history charts

Horse racing awards
Horse racing in the United States
Awards established in 1936
1936 establishments in the United States